Mehdi Vaezi (born 6 March 1975, in Azadshahr, Iran) is a former Iranian football player. He has lived and grew up in Mashhad between ages of 7 until 23.

Club career
Vaezi played for Paykan Tehran F.C. before moving to Persepolis F.C. in 2006 on a 2-year deal. Earlier that year he was involved in a drug abuse scandal which ended in a 6-month ban from football and the breakdown of a transfer to F.C. Zob Ahan. Eventually he signed for Persepolis F.C.

During the 2006/07 season he only played a few matches for Persepolis behind the first keeper Farshid Karimi who had an incredible season but during the 2007/08 season he was the first choice keeper for most of the games but never played in the Tehran derby. This season went really well for him because he was known for his great saves and reflects but more importantly the fans preferred him over the other keepers such as international Goalkeeper Hassan Roudbarian and the previous season's first choice Farshid Karimi.

During the 2008/09 Vaezi had many injuries which made him sit out many matches and a lot of critics believe that if he was not injured as much Persepolis would have done better in the league.

Club Career statistics
Last Update  19 October 2010

International career
On 17 March 1997 he made the 31-man list for the national team but did not get selected for any games
He made his debut for Iran in a friendly match against Georgia in August 2000. He was called up to join the squad in a few occasions, including in 2007, but did not make any other appearance for Team Melli before January 2008, when he made his second cap in a friendly match against Qatar.

Honours

Iran's Premier Football League Winner: 1
2007/08 with Persepolis

References

External links
Mehdi Vaezi banned for six months after positive test

Iranian footballers
Iran international footballers
Association football goalkeepers
Paykan F.C. players
Saba players
Payam Mashhad players
Persepolis F.C. players
Machine Sazi F.C. players
steel Azin F.C. players
2000 AFC Asian Cup players
Sportspeople from Mashhad
People from Golestan Province
1975 births
Living people
Bahman players